Coldwater is an unincorporated community in Calloway County, Kentucky, United States.  The original site of the community was developed by Byrd Ezell in the early 1840s.  The post office was established on December 9, 1856, and was active until 1907.

References

Unincorporated communities in Calloway County, Kentucky
Unincorporated communities in Kentucky